Dobrić is an uninhabited settlement in Croatia, in the municipality of Voćin, Virovitica-Podravina County.

Demographics
According to the 2011 census, the village of Dobrić has no inhabitants.

The 1991 census recorded that 96.88% of the village population were ethnic Serbs (62/64),  1.56% were Yugoslavs (1/64) and 1.56% were of other ethnic origin (1/64).

References 

Ghost towns in Croatia
Municipalities of Croatia
Slavonia
Serb communities in Croatia